Marko Gušić (born 6 August 2002) is a Serbian professional basketball player for Crvena zvezda.

Early career 
Gušić grew up playing basketball for youth systems of Mladost Zemun, Mega Basket, and Vizura before joining to the Crvena zvezda youth system in May 2019.

Professional career 
On 25 August 2020, Gušić officially signed his first professional contract with Crvena zvezda. On 24 September 2021, Gušić signed new four-year contract with the Zvezda. On the same day, he made his ABA League debut in their season opening 97–61 win over Split, making 2 points, 2 rebounds, an assist, and 2 steals in under 16 minutes of playing time. On 7 October, he made his EuroLeague debut in a 75–63 win over Maccabi Tel Aviv, recording only seven seconds of playing time. He was loaned to FMP on 28 December 2021.

Career statistics

Euroleague

|-
| style="text-align:left;"| 2021–22
| style="text-align:left;"| Crvena zvezda mts
| 1 || 0 || 0:07 || .000 || .000 || .000 || 0.0 || 0.0 || 0.0 || 0.0 || 0.0 || 0.0
|-
|- class="sortbottom"
| style="text-align:center;" colspan="2"| Career
| 1 || 0 || 0:07 || .000 || .000 || .000 || 0.0 || 0.0 || 0.0 || 0.0 || 0.0 || 0.0

Personal life 
His grand-father was Novica Gušić, a colonel in the Army of Republika Srpska.

References

External links 
 Profile at eurobasket.com
 Profile at euroleague.net
 Profile at realgm.com
 Profile at ABA League

2002 births
Living people
ABA League players
Basketball players from Belgrade
KK Crvena zvezda players
KK FMP players
Serbian men's basketball players
Serbian people of Bosnia and Herzegovina descent
Shooting guards
Small forwards